Religious offense is any action which offends religious sensibilities and arouses serious negative emotions in people with strong belief.

Causes

Different religions are sensitive to different things in different measure, particularly such topics as sexuality, infancy, society, and warfare. Religious offense can be caused deliberately or by religious intolerance, especially between specific religious beliefs regarding "sacred truth". However every religion is essentially a set of beliefs conveyed from generation to generation which are, by religious definition, held to be immutable truths by that religion's believers or followers. Anything that tends to weaken or break that chain of authoritative continuity is likely to be offensive and in some jurisdictions severely punishable.

The secular belief that freedom of speech and the absence of censorship should allow religious practices or beliefs to be criticized is also a cause of conflict. The use or misuse of religious paraphernalia, particularly scripture may also cause offense.

Traditionally
Traditionally there are three uniquely religious offenses (acts which cause religious offense):
 Heresy (wrong choice) means questioning or doubting dogmatic established beliefs 
 Blasphemy (evil-speaking) is the act of insulting or showing contempt for a religious deity. 
 Apostasy (revolt or renunciation) implies or abandoning of a prescribed religious duty, especially disloyalty, sedition and defection

Any challenge to divine authority may be homologous to treason and attract similar serious punishment, typically the death penalty.

More recently
There is a fine line between secular ideas of fair comment and religious offence caused by questioning the veracity of divine revelation.

LittleBigPlanet, a game which included two short scriptural phrases, was considered offensive by Muslims.

More recently the term is used in modern laws which aim to promote religious tolerance by forbidding hate crime such as the British Racial and Religious Hatred Act 2006.

Legal
Blasphemy laws were once almost universal, and are still common in states with strong religious traditions, but such restrictions have been extinguished in most secular jurisdictions that incorporate the principles of the Universal Declaration of Human Rights (UDHR). Article 18 of the UDHR allows: "the right to "freedom of thought, conscience and religion; this right includes freedom to change religion or belief, and freedom, either alone or in community with others and in public or private, to manifest religion or belief in teaching, practice, worship and observance"; and Article 19 allows: "the right to freedom of opinion and expression; this right includes freedom to hold opinions without interference and to seek, receive and impart information and ideas through any media and regardless of frontiers". With these two articles, Article 18 of the UDHR allows people to hold and express religious ideas and other beliefs or a lack of religious belief that may be offensive to others or to the majority of citizens and Article 19 explicitly mandates freedom of speech which permits citizens to criticize leaders in a way that some religious people may find seriously offensive.

Some extreme religious leaders in such secular societies campaign for the offence of blasphemy to be reinstated to enforce respect for their various religious beliefs above any scientific or moral challenge.

See also
 Censorship by religion
 Criticism of Christianity
 Criticism of Islam
 Criticism of religion
 Sacred
 Sacred-profane dichotomy
 Secularity
 The Satanic Verses

References

Religious belief and doctrine
Dogma